This is a list of holidays in Lesotho.

January 1: New Year's Day
March 11: Moshoeshoe's Day
March 29: Good Friday
April 1: Easter Monday
May 1: Workers' Day
May 10: Ascension Day
May 25: Africa Day
July 17: King's Birthday
October 4: Independence Day
December 25: Christmas Day
December 26: Boxing Day

References 

Lesotho culture
Lesotho
Lesotho